South Browning is a census-designated place (CDP) in Glacier County, Montana, United States. The population was 1,785 at the 2010 census. South Browning is a rural village on the Blackfeet Indian Reservation. It is bordered to the north by the town of Browning.

Geography
South Browning is located at  (48.549869, -113.014594).

Demographics

As of the census of 2000, there were 1,677 people, 475 households, and 391 families residing in the CDP. The population density was 719.4 people per square mile (277.9/km). There were 526 housing units at an average density of 225.6/sq mi (87.2/km). The racial makeup of the CDP was 2.44% White, 0.12% African American, 94.39% Native American, 0.54% from other races, and 2.50% from two or more races. Hispanic or Latino of any race were 2.15% of the population.

There were 475 households, out of which 53.3% had children under the age of 18 living with them, 42.5% were married couples living together, 32.0% had a female householder with no husband present, and 17.5% were non-families. 15.2% of all households were made up of individuals, and 2.9% had someone living alone who was 65 years of age or older. The average household size was 3.52 and the average family size was 3.90.

In the CDP, the population was spread out, with 43.2% under the age of 18, 10.3% from 18 to 24, 27.9% from 25 to 44, 14.6% from 45 to 64, and 4.0% who were 65 years of age or older. The median age was 22 years. For every 100 females, there were 93.2 males. For every 100 females age 18 and over, there were 79.8 males.

The median income for a household in the CDP was $12,130, and the median income for a family was $16,167. Males had a median income of $20,278 versus $18,068 for females. The per capita income for the CDP was $5,666. About 51.3% of families and 49.2% of the population were below the poverty line, including 52.8% of those under age 18 and 43.4% of those age 65 or over.

References

Census-designated places in Glacier County, Montana
Census-designated places in Montana